Hetangxia station, is a station of Line 14 of the Guangzhou Metro. It started operations on 28 December 2017.

Station Layout
The station has an underground island platform.

Exits
There are 4 exits, lettered A, B, C and D. Exit D is accessible. All exits are located on Jiulong Avenue.

References

Railway stations in China opened in 2017
Guangzhou Metro stations in Huangpu District